Simona Halep was the defending champion but chose to not participate.

Aryna Sabalenka won the title, defeating Alison Riske in the final, 4–6, 7–6(7–2), 6–3.

Seeds

Draw

Finals

Top half

Bottom half

Qualifying

Seeds

Qualifiers

Qualifying draw

First qualifier

Second qualifier

Third qualifier

Fourth qualifier

References
 Main draw
 Qualifying draw

WTA Shenzhen Open – Singles
2019 Singles